Hurricane Fernanda in 1993 was the first significant hurricane threat to Hawaii since Hurricane Iniki struck in September 1992. The seventh named storm and fourth major hurricane of the 1993 Pacific hurricane season, Fernanda developed on August 9 off the coast of Mexico from a tropical wave. After weakening slightly, Fernanda restrengthened and was expected to move across the Hawaiian Islands. Instead, the hurricane slowed its forward motion and turned away from the state, although it still produced high waves along the eastern shore of the islands. Several homes were damaged, and the surf damaged coastal roads. The storm also contributed to rainfall across the state, and minor flooding occurred in Kauai. Fernanda became extratropical on August 19, and after turning to the northeast became absorbed by a cold front.

Meteorological history

Hurricane Fernanda origins were as a tropical wave that was first observed in the deep Atlantic Ocean on July 28. It moved across the Atlantic and Caribbean Sea, and developed an area of thunderstorms to the south of Panama on August 4. The system gradually organized as it continued westward, and on August 9, it developed into Tropical Depression Seven-E about 400 miles south of Manzanillo, Colima. Upon being classified, the National Hurricane Center (NHC) described the depression as "a large monsoon-like system", with abundant convection and well-defined upper-level outflow. With a ridge to its north, the depression tracked steadily west-northwestward, and gradual strengthening was expected.

Within 12 hours of forming, the depression intensified into Tropical Storm Fernanda. Banding features increased, and outflow became well-established throughout the storm. Fernanda intensified further and attained hurricane status late on August 10. Soon after, a large eye became evident on satellite imagery, which became more distinct and organized. The peak winds were based on estimates from the Dvorak technique. After maintaining peak winds for about 18 hours, the hurricane began a slow weakening trend. By August 14, the eye had become less distinct as the storm moved over cooler waters, while winds decreased to below major hurricane status, or Category 3 intensity. At that time, the NHC forecast Fernanda to decelerate and turn to the northwest, although the possibility of a more westward track toward Hawaii was noted.

On August 14, the Central Pacific Hurricane Center (CPHC) took over issuing warnings on the hurricane, as Fernanda crossed 140° W into their area of responsibility. After maintaining a west-northwest track for much of its duration, the hurricane turned more toward the west. By August 15, the storm was expected to pass between Maui and the Big Island of Hawaii; however, the CPHC noted uncertainty due to an approaching upper-level trough, which would produce a more northerly tack. Hurricane Hunters flew into the hurricane to provide observational data while it was near Hawaii.

Early on August 16, Hurricane Fernanda was expected to continue westward and bring hurricane-force winds to the Big Island of Hawaii. By later in the day, however, it slowed significantly due to the approaching trough to its north. It began its definitive motion toward the northwest and began weakening due to increasing wind shear. Later on August 17, Fernanda weakened to tropical storm strength, by which time convection was largely removed from the circulation. On August 19, the storm transitioned into an extratropical storm, and advisories were discontinued. The remnants of Fernanda turned to the northeast, and on August 21 an approaching cold front absorbed the circulation off the coast of Washington.

Impact

Early on August 15, the Central Pacific Hurricane Center (CPHC) issued a tropical storm watch for the Big Island of Hawaii, meaning gale-force winds were possible within 36 hours; concurrently, a high surf advisory was put into effect for all eastward facing shorelines. By late on August 15, the CPHC issued a hurricane watch for the entire state of Hawaii. Early the next day, the CPHC upgraded the watch to a hurricane warning for the Big Island of Hawaii, as Fernanda was expected to continue its westward track. When the hurricane slowed, its movement was uncertain, although all watches and warnings were canceled by August 17, when Fernanda began its northwest track. Officials opened nine shelters on the Big Island, and about 200 people stayed in them until the hurricane watches were canceled. One shelter near Hilo held 80 people due to concern of the high waves. Officials on the Big Island closed and evacuated all of the beach parks on August 15. On Molokai, 40 hikers were evacuated from a valley prone to flooding. Residents bought emergency supplies on Kauai, which had been struck by powerful Hurricane Iniki 11 months prior.

While moving slowly for a few days, Hurricane Fernanda produced high surf along the eastern shores of the Hawaiian Islands. The rough waves prompted the closure of several beaches in Maui and the Big Island. Wave heights reached  in most places, while portions of Maui experienced up to  waves. The surf damaged coastal roads along most of the islands, and some homes were flooded. One home in Maui was moved several feet off of its foundation due to the waves. In the harbor at Hilo, one boat was damaged and another was destroyed, and in the Puna district, 12 homes were damaged. Although the hurricane remained away from the islands, moisture from Fernanda combined with an upper-level trough to produce rainfall across the state. Precipitation was heaviest in Kauai, where some minor flooding was reported. After Fernanda became extratropical in the shipping lanes of the north Pacific, several vessels reported gale-force winds.

See also

 Hurricane Felicia (2009)
 List of Hawaii hurricanes
 List of Category 4 Pacific hurricanes

References

Fernanda (1993)
Fernanda
Hurricanes in Hawaii
1993 in Hawaii